Tageblatt is a German language Luxembourgish daily newspaper published in Esch-sur-Alzette by Editpress.

History and profile
Tageblatt was established in 1913. The paper is the country's second-most popular newspaper, behind the rival Luxemburger Wort. Tageblatt describes itself as the Zeitung fir Lëtzebuerg (Luxembourgish for the newspaper for Luxembourg). Although it is mainly published in German, it has also sections published in French language.

The daily is owned by socialist trade unions. The publisher is Editpress Luxembourg SA, which also publishes Le Jeudi and Le Quotidien. As of 2007 the daily had close relations with the Socialist Party (LSAP).

The newspaper received €1,659,554 in annual state press subsidy in 2009: more than any other newspaper.

The circulation of Tageblatt was 27,081 copies in 2003. In 2004, the paper had a daily circulation of 17,106: about one-quarter that of Luxemburger Wort. In the mid-2000s its readership was 61,100, or just over one-third that of its rival.

Footnotes

External links
 Tageblatt official website

Daily newspapers published in Luxembourg
German-language newspapers published in Luxembourg
Mass media in Esch-sur-Alzette
Newspapers established in 1913
1913 establishments in Luxembourg